Wong Ho Leng (21 December 1959 – 21 June 2014) was a Malaysian politician. He was the opposition leader of the Sarawak State Assembly from May 2006 to June 2013. He was also the state chairman of the Democratic Action Party (DAP) from 2001 until 10 June 2013. He was the Member of the State Legislative Assembly of Sarawak for the seat of Bukit Assek until his death on 21 June 2014.

Political career
Wong Ho Leng joined DAP on 19 April 1986. He made a stir in the Sarawak politics in 1996 state election when he defeated the Sarawak United Peoples' Party president and deputy chief minister of Sarawak Tan Sri Dr.Wong Soon Kai by a slim majority of 226 votes in the Bukit Assek constituency. He was subsequently defeated by Daniel Ngieng in 2001 state election, but wrested the same constituency back in 2006 state election.

Wong contested against the Barisan Nasional's Tiong Thai King in 1999 in the Lanang Parliamentary constituency but lost in that election. On 16 May 2010, he was elected to Parliament in the Sibu by-election. His victory saw the DAP wrest the seat from Barisan Nasional. He was the DAP candidate for Sibu in the 1995, 2004 and 2008 elections, but was defeated by Barisan Nasional's Robert Lau Hoi Chew on each occasion.

In 2011 state election, he successfully defended his constituency against Chieng Buong Toon of Sarawak United People's Party and independent candidate Hii Tiong Huat, with a huge majority of 8,827 votes, thus breaking the so-called the "Rhythm of the Pendulum", which was a hot topic among the politicians from both sides prior to the elections.

Suspension from State Assembly
In May 2009, Wong Ho Leng was suspended from the state assembly for 1 year due to his "camouflage" remark against the Second Finance Minister Datuk Seri Wong Soon Koh. The speaker, Datuk Seri Mohamad Asfia Awang Nassar, cited Section 14 (1) of the State Legislative Assembly (Privileges & Powers) Ordinance 2007 for the suspension after 60 Barisan Nasional assemblypersons voted in favour for Wong's suspension.

Health
On 12 January 2013, Wong announced that he has been diagnosed of brain tumour (glioma) on his brain stem, which was responsible for the slurring of his speech and impaired swallowing function. He had undergone six-weeks of chemotherapy and radiotherapy in Singapore. On 23 February, he announced that he would not defend for the Sibu parliamentary seat in 2013 Malaysian general elections on doctors' advice. He went into a coma on 2 May 2014 but never woke up from it. On 17 May, the Sarawak government had approved RM 1 million to pay for Ho Leng's medical expenses.

Death
He died on 21 June 2014 at Rejang Medical Centre, Sibu after a year-and-a-half struggle with brain cancer. His funeral service was held at Hwai Ang Methodist church and his remains were buried at Methodist Cemetery, Sibu.

Election Results

Publications

Posthumous Publication 
Last Writings was a diary written by Wong himself when he was diagnosed with a brain cancer on December 21, 2012. The book was written as he wanted to share his thoughts, fears, struggles and his determination to fight cancer with people of Sarawak especially Sibu. However, the book’s entry was only up till October 2, 2013 as Wong had lost his sense of coordination and balance on September 18, 2013. Last Writings is available in both English and Mandarin Version. 

 Last Writings (2021) ISBN 978-967-19903-0-8

References

1959 births
2014 deaths
Deaths from brain cancer in Malaysia
Members of the Sarawak State Legislative Assembly
Members of the Dewan Rakyat
Democratic Action Party (Malaysia) politicians
People from Sarawak
University of New South Wales alumni
University of Sydney alumni
20th-century Malaysian lawyers
Leaders of the Opposition in the Sarawak State Legislative Assembly
Malaysian Methodists
Malaysian politicians of Chinese descent